Hideaway Girl is a 1936 American comedy film directed by George Archainbaud and written by David Garth and Joseph Moncure March. The film stars Shirley Ross, Robert Cummings, Martha Raye, Monroe Owsley, Elizabeth Russell and Louis Da Pron. The film was released on November 20, 1936, by Paramount Pictures.

Plot

Cast 
Shirley Ross as Toni Ainsworth
Robert Cummings as Mike Winslow
Martha Raye as Helen Flint
Monroe Owsley as Count de Montaigne
Elizabeth Russell as Cellette
Louis Da Pron as Tom Flint
Ray Walker as Freddie
Robert Middlemass as Capt. Dixon
Edward Brophy as Bugs Murphy
James Eagles as Birdie Arnold
Bob Murphy as Capt. MacArthur
Lee Phelps as Police Sgt. Davis
Kenneth Harlan as Lead steward
Jimmie Dundee as Detective
Marten Lamont as Sailor
Frank Losee Jr. as Sailor
A.S. 'Pop' Byron as Dock watchman
Chester Gan as Chinese cook
Harry Jordan as Chauffeur
Allen Pomeroy as Chauffeur
James Barton as Motorcycle cop
Donald Kerr as Cameraman
Bert Moorhouse as Cameraman
Wilma Francis as Muriel Courtney

Production
Cummings was cast when Lew Ayres refused to play the role.

Reception
Frank Nugent of The New York Times said, "Miss Martha Raye, the lusty lark of Paramount's roster of curiosa, has her starring moment in Hideaway Girl, current at the Rialto. Some one in our circle has suggested that the explosive Miss Raye has but one opportunity left—to swallow a stick of dynamite and light the fuse, distributing her animated self over a Paramount set. In Hideaway Girl Miss Raye falls sadly short of this mark, contenting herself, in her own peculiar form of vociferation, with expressing her preference for "Liszt, Beethoven or Bach" over the current manifestation of vo-de-o-do. She expresses this preference with swing dance gestures."

The Picturegoer's Lionel Collier wrote "it all wears very thin and becomes distinctly boring towards the end. This sense of boredom is not helped by the singing of Miss Raye, the lady who rivals Joe E. Brown in mouth appeal. Shirley Ross sings pleasingly as a contrast, and Bob Cummings makes a passable hero.

References

External links 
 

1936 films
Paramount Pictures films
American comedy films
1936 comedy films
Films directed by George Archainbaud
American black-and-white films
1930s English-language films
1930s American films